Bessèges is a commune in the Gard department in France. It is situated on the river Cèze.

History

Historically Bessèges was a hamlet of Robiac. Its importance began with the opening of a coal mine in 1809, followed by an iron and steel plant in 1833, and eventually the railway reached it in 1857. The commune was created in 1857 from parts of Gagnières and Robiac-Rochessadoule.

At its peak in the late 19th century, the population was over 11,000. However, during the 20th century it declined and eventually the mine was abandoned in 1964, and the steel-works in 1987. Today its economy is based on tourism, and it is home to the Étoile de Bessèges road bicycle race.

Population

See also
 Communes of the Gard department

References

External links

Official website (in French)

Communes of Gard
Gard communes articles needing translation from French Wikipedia